Toyota Motor Corporation's A family is a family of automatic FWD/RWD/4WD/AWD transmissions built by Aisin-Warner.  They share much in common with Volvo's AW7* and Aisin-Warner's 03-71* transmissions, which are found in Suzukis, Mitsubishis, and other Asian vehicles.

The codes are divided into three sections:
The letter A = Aisin-Warner Automatic.
Two or three digits.
Older transmissions have two digits.
The first digit represents the generation (not the number of gears, see A10 vs A20 and A30 vs A40 vs A40D).
The last digit represents the particular application.
Newer transmission have three digits.
The first digit represents the generation. Note: the sequence is 1,2,...,9,A,B with A and B being treated as digits.
The second digit represents the number of gears.
The last digit represents the particular application.
Letters representing particular features:
 D = Separates 3-speed A4x series from 4-speed A4xD series
 E = Electronic control
 F = Four wheel drive
 H = AWD Transverse mount engine
 L = Lock-up torque converter

Axx

A10

1959 Toyoglide two speed semi-automatic, largely based on GM's cast iron Powerglide.

A20
1963 two speed Toyoglide fully automatic.

A30
Toyoglide three speed automatic

Applications (calendar years):
1967 Toyota Crown and Corona Mark II 
1970–1973 Corona
Crown
Mark II
1971-1973 Celica
Carina
Corolla

A32
1970 Toyota A32 3-Speed Electronically Controlled Automatic Transmission (EAT)

A40
Three speed automatic

Applications (calendar years):
 Carina 1600 RWD 08/75-04/84
 Carina 1800 RWD 04/81-04/84
 Celica 2000 RWD 01/78-07/82
 Corolla 1300 03/80-09/83
 Corona liftback 04/79-03/81
 Cressida 12/77-06/81
 Cressida 2000 05/81-09/82/
 Mark2 x30/x40 2000 1976–1980
 Crown 2600 05/77-03/80
 Starlet 1300 02/82-02/85
 1978–80 Toyota Pickup 2WD 2.2L I4 20R

A40D
Four speed automatic

Applications (calendar years):
1977–1980 Celica Supra
1983–1986 Celica Supra (Australia)
1981 Corona
1981 Toyota Cressida
1981–1985 Celica 22R

A41
Three speed automatic

Applications (calendar years):
 1981–1984 Starlet KP61
 1981–1984 Corolla KE70

A42D

Four speed automatic

Application (calendar years):
1987 Toyota Cressida
 1996-2001 Toyota Chaser/Mark II/Cresta (GX100)

A42DL
Four speed automatic with lockup torque converter

Applications (calendar years):
 1984–1987 Toyota Corolla SR5
 1987–1999 Toyota Crown equipped with 2.0 L 1G

A43
Three speed automatic

Applications (calendar years):

 1981 Toyota Pickup 2WD 2.4L I4 22R/RE (Federal emissions only, California emissions used A43D)

A43D
Four speed automatic without lockup torque converter.

This transmission model is not electronically controlled.
It is instead controlled by throttle position and also by a governor.

Manufacturer designation: Aisin Warner 03-71

Applications (calendar years):
 1981 Toyota Celica Supra
 1982–1985 Toyota Celica XX 2000G/S turbo
 1996-2001 Toyota Chaser/Mark II/Cresta (LX100)
 1982–1985 Volvo 240 2.1L Turbo I4 (AW71)
 1985–1991 Volvo 740 2.3L Turbo I4 (AW71)
 1985–1990 Volvo 760 2.3L Turbo I4 (AW71)
 1985–1990 Volvo 760 2.8L V6 (AW71)
 1988–1991 Volvo 780 2.3L Turbo I4 (AW71)
 1987–1990 Volvo 780 2.8L V6 (AW71)
 1991 Volvo 960 2.8L V6 (AW71 – Australia only) 
 1991–1995 Volvo 940 2.3L Turbo I4 (AW71)
 1981 Toyota Pickup 2WD 2.4L I4 22R (California emissions only, Federal emissions used A43)
 1982–1995 Toyota Pickup 2WD 2.4L I4 22R/RE
 1982–1995 Toyota Cab/Chassis 2.4L I4 22R/RE (flatbed, cube, motorhome)
 1995–2000 Toyota Tacoma 2WD 2.4L I4 2RZ
 1982 Toyota Crown Royal 2.8L I6 5MG
 1995-2007 Toyota Comfort/Crown Comfort (LXS/YXS)

A43DL
Four speed automatic with lockup torque converter. Based on A43D.

Manufacturer designation: Aisin Warner 03-71L

Applications (calendar years):
 1983–1985 Toyota Cressida
 1982–1985 Toyota Land Cruiser
 1982 Toyota Celica Supra
 1990–1992 Volvo 740 2.3L Turbo I4 (AW71L)
 1991–1997 Volvo 940 2.3L Turbo I4 (AW71L)

A43DE
Four speed automatic with lockup torque converter and electronic controls. Based on A43D.

Applications (calendar years):
 1982–1987 Toyota Cressida
 1995-2002 Toyota Granvia
 1983–1986 Toyota Celica Supra
 1992-up Suzuki Sidekick (4L30E)
 1995–1998 Volvo 960/S90/V90 (AW30-43LE)

A44D

Four speed automatic without lockup torque converter.

This transmission is electronically controlled by an electronic shift control module. Mechanically similar to the A43D.

Applications (calendar years):
 1989–1991 4Runner
 2001–2004 Toyota Tacoma 2WD 2.4L I4 2RZ

A44DL
Four speed automatic with lockup torque converter

Applications (calendar years):
 1982–1991 Toyota Van
 1989–1990 Volvo 740 GLE 16-Valve (AW72L)
 1991 Volvo 940 GLE 16-Valve (AW72L)
 1992–1995 Mitsubishi Montero 5 Dr. V43 (03-72L)(V4AW2)
 1992–1995 Mitsubishi L300 – (P04v) (P03V)
 1992–1995 Mitsubishi Express – (P03V) (V4AW2)
 1997–1999 Hyundai Galloper

A45DL
Applications (calendar years):
 1982–1990 Toyota Van

A46DE
Four speed automatic with lockup torque converter and electronic controls

Applications (calendar years):
1990–1999 Toyota Previa/Tarago (RWD, non-supercharged)
1990–2000 Toyota Estima (RWD, non-supercharged)
1990–2000 Toyota Estima Lucida (RWD, non-supercharged)
1990–2000 Toyota Estima Emina (RWD, non-supercharged)

A46DF
Four speed automatic with lockup torque converter, electronic controls and viscous coupling center differential

Applications (calendar years):

1990–1999 Toyota Previa/Tarago (AllTrac/4WD, non-supercharged)
1990–2000 Toyota Estima (4WD, non-supercharged)
1990–2000 Toyota Estima Lucida (4WD, non-supercharged)
1990–2000 Toyota Estima Emina (4WD, non-supercharged)

A47DE
4 Speed Automatic Transmission

Applications (calendar years):
 1998–2005 Lexus IS 200

A55

Three speed automatic front wheel drive, longitudinally mounted. Even with FWD, the engine is also mounted longitudinally.

Applications (calendar years):
 1979–1981 Toyota Tercel AL11
 1982–1986 Toyota Tercel AL20

A1xx
FF Transaxle

A130
Transmission ratios

A131L
3 Speed Automatic Transaxle

Applications (calendar years):
 1984–2002 Toyota Corolla
 1985–1988 Chevrolet Nova
 1989–2000 Geo Prizm (rebadged Chevrolet Prizm after 1997)

A132L
3 Speed Automatic Transaxle

Applications (calendar years):
 1988–1999 Tercel (3 spd.)
 1988–1992 Corolla European, Asian, Latin Markets (3 spd. auto)
 1993-1998 Toyota Starlet (2E, 3 spd. auto)

A140E
4 Speed Electronic Controlled Automatic Transaxle (ECT)

Applications (calendar years):
 1997–2000 Geo Prizm(4 cyl.) (rebadged Chevrolet Prizm after 1997)
 1986–1989 Celica GT/GT-S (with ECT-S)
 1994–1999 Celica GT
 1994–1998 Curren ST206/ST207/ST208 (with ECT-S)
 1992–2001 Camry (4 cyl.)
 1999–2001 Solara Camry (4 cyl.)

A140L
4 Speed Hydraulic Controlled Automatic Transaxle (2-way overdrive)

Applications (calendar years):
 1985–1986 Camry TurboDiesel
 1986–1989 Celica ST/GT (without ECT)

These transmissions have a governor gear. Unlike the A140E counterpart which is electronically controlled, the A140L uses a plastic governor gear to select which gear to go into. Over time and wear, this plastic gear's teeth shred and eventually cease to be able to control gears. This results in a transmission that can only shift to first and reverse, but not to any further forward gears. Replacement of this governor gear is relatively inexpensive compared to a replacement transmission as it can be serviced without taking the transmission out of the car.

A2xx
FF Transaxle

A240L
4 Speed Automatic Transaxle

Applications (calendar years):
 1985–1992 Corolla (4 spd.) (includes FX)

A240E
4 Speed Automatic Transaxle
Applications (calendar years):

 1984–1989 Toyota MR2 na
 1988– Chevrolet Nova

A241E
4 Speed Automatic Transaxle

Applications (calendar years):
 1990–2005 Celica GTS
 1988–1989 MR2 S/C
 1991–1995 MR2 2.2 5S-FE
 1989–1999 MR2 2.0 3S-GE and 3S-FE
 1996–1997 RAV4
 1992–1998 Corona
 1998–2000 Avensis

A241F
4 Speed Automatic Transaxle(AWD)

Applications (calendar years):
 1990–1992 Corolla (AWD)

A241L
4 Speed Automatic Transaxle

Applications (calendar years):
 1986–1987 Corona (Japan)
 1990–1991 Celica GT
 1988–1992 Carina II
 1996–2000 Corolla

A242L
4 Speed Automatic Transaxle

Applications (calendar years):
 1995–1999 Tercel
 1990–1995 Sera
 Early EP82 Starlet
 EP91 Starlet

A243L
4 Speed Automatic Transaxle

Applications (calendar years):
 1990–1993 Celica ST

A242E
4 Speed Automatic Transaxle

Applications (calendar years):
EP82 Starlet GT
EP91 Glanza (Starlet)

A244E
4 Speed Automatic Transaxle

Applications (calendar years):
 1992–1999 Paseo

A245E
4 Speed Transaxle A245E was based on the A240E used in the 1989 MR2, but was reduced in size and weight

Applications (calendar years):
 1993–1997 Toyota Corolla 1.6 4A-FE/4A-GE
 1993–1998 Toyota Corolla 1.8 7A-FE
 1999–2008 Toyota Corolla 1.8 1ZZ-FE
 1993–1997 Geo Prizm LSI 1.6
Number of disc B3 is changed from 6 to 5 in 2005

Gear ratios for this transmission.

Corolla Final Drive Axle

A246E
Gear ratios for this transmission:

Applications (calendar years):
 1994–1999 Toyota Celica ST
 2002-2007 Toyota Corolla 1.6 VVT-i 3ZZ-FE engine
 1997–2001 Toyota Corolla Spacio (AE111N 4AFE) 2WD (A246E-01A)
 2003–2007 Toyota Matrix (with VVT-i Engine)
 2003–2008 Pontiac Vibe (same as Toyota Matrix engine 1ZZ-FE)
 2000–2001 Toyota Avensis 1.8 VVT-i 1ZZ-FE engine

A3xx
FR Transmission

A340H
4 Speed Automatic Transmission (4x4)

Applications (calendar years):
 1988–1995 4x4 Trucks w/ V6
 1988–1995 Toyota 4Runner (4x4) w/ V6 and ECT (electronic controlled transmission)
 1998–2005 Toyota Altezza Gita (GXE15W and JCE15W)
 1987–2001 Jeep Cherokee 4.0L (AW4)
 1987–1992 Jeep Comanche 4.0L (AW4)
 1993–1993.5 Jeep Grand Cherokee 4.0L (AW4)
 1988–1991 Isuzu Trooper 2.6 4 Cylinder

A340E (30-40LE)

The detachable bell housing, which attaches the main transmission case to the engine, has an engine-specific bolt pattern, which appears on its upper surface as cast-in letters. "J" indicates the straight-6 1/2-JZ engine, "U" the V8 UZ engine.

Applications (calendar years):
 1987–1992 Toyota Cressida (30-40LE)
 1986–1993 Toyota Supra (MA70)
 1986–1992 Toyota Supra (GA70)
 1990–1993 Toyota Supra (JZA70)
 1993–1996 Toyota Supra (2JZ-GE) (JZA80)
 1990–2000 Toyota Chaser/Mark II/Cresta 2.5 (1JZ-GE)
 1995–2013 Toyota Tacoma 2.7L I4 (2WD), 3.4L V6
 1993–1995 Toyota T100 3.0L V6
 1993–1998 Toyota Previa 2.4L w/supercharger
 1991–1997 Toyota Aristo (2JZ-GE)
 1992–2000 Lexus SC 300
 1992–1997 Lexus SC 400
 2008–2018 Toyota Comfort (TSS11) (TSS13)
 2008–2018 Toyota Crown Comfort (TSS10)
 1990–1995 Toyota Crown Majesta 3.0L I6
 1999–2003 Toyota Crown Athlete V (1JZ-GTE)
 1991–2000 Toyota Soarer (JZZ30)
 1990–1994 Lexus LS 400
 1989–2003 Toyota 4Runner (4x2) (30-40LE)
 2001–2004 Toyota Sequoia (4x2)
 2000–2004 Toyota Tundra (4x2)
 2005–2007 Toyota Commuter 2.5L
 1985–1995 Toyota Pick-Up 3.0L
 1990–1994 Volvo 960 3.0L
 2004–2009 Isuzu D-Max (4x2)3.5L V6
 2004 Isuzu Rodeo 3.2L V6
 2008 Isuzu d tec 3.0l 4x4

A340E (30-40LS)

OEM with 2JZ-GTE twin turbocharged engines only. This is the twin turbo only heavy duty version with some internal mods. The main case is similar to the common A340E but not interchangeable, the bell housing has "J3" cast into the upper surface, and is larger diameter to accept the larger torque converter and special flex plate. Maximum power using the stock internals should be limited to 500 (significantly higher than the standard A340E used with the 2JZ-GE normally aspirated engine) .

Applications (calendar years):
 1997–2002 Toyota Supra RZ (JZA80)
 1991–1997 Toyota Aristo 3.0V (JZS147)
 1997–2004 Toyota Aristo V300 (JZS161)
 2004 Isuzu Axiom 3.5L V6
 2004 Isuzu Rodeo 3.5L V6

A340F (30-40LE)
Applications (calendar years):
 1985–2004 Toyota 4Runner
 2000–2004 Toyota Tundra (4x4)
 1985–1995 Toyota Pickup (4x4 w/ 4 cyl)
 1995–1998 Toyota T-100 (4x4)
 1995–2015 Toyota Tacoma (4x4, 2005–2015 4 cyl only)
 2001–2004 Toyota Sequoia (4x4)1st
 2005-2014 Toyota Hilux (4x4)list

A341E (30-41LE)
Applications (calendar years):
 1990–2000 Toyota Chaser/Mark II/Cresta 2.5 GT/Tourer V (1JZ-GTE)
 1991–1997 Toyota Soarer 4.0L V8
 1993–1995 Lexus GS 300
 1992–1999 Lexus SC 400 GT-L V8 cdn spec.
 1995-1997 Lexus LS 400
 1988–1990 Toyota Crown Royal Saloon G 4.0 V8
 1987–1999 Toyota Crown JZS130 (sedans and wagons)
 1991–1995 Toyota Crown Majesta 4.0L V8
 1992–1998 Volvo 2.9L I6 (AW30-40LE)

A341F
The A341F is an A340F with locking/unlocking transfer case differential to allow an AWD mode on the Sequoia.

Applications (calendar years):
2001–2004 Toyota Sequoia (4x4)

A342E
Applications (calendar years):
 1997–2004 Toyota Century (GZG50)

A343E
Applications (calendar years):
 2001–2004 Toyota Mark II iR-V (1JZ-GTE)
 1993–1995 Lexus GS 300 (GCC Spec)-(2JZ-GE)
 2004–2015 Toyota Innova (2TR-FE & 2KD-FTV)

A343F
Applications (calendar years):
 1990–1992 Toyota Land Cruiser II JDM 2.4 (4X4)
 1990–1996 Toyota Hilux Surf 4x4 – 2.4 & 3.0 (4x4)
 1993–2014 Toyota Land Cruiser Prado (3.0l,2.7l)
 1995–1997 Toyota Land Cruiser 80-series (4x4)
 1998–2001 Toyota Land Cruiser 100-series (4x4)
 1996–1998 Lexus LX 450 (4x4)
 1998–2002 Lexus LX 470 (4x4)
 2005–2014 Toyota Fortuner V 2.7 At (4x4)

A350E
5 Speed Automatic.

Applications (calendar years):
 1996–1997 Lexus GS 300

NOTE: Replaced by A650E for 1998 model year.

Gear ratios for this transmission.

A4xx
FR Transmission

A440F
Type: Full automatic 4-speed transmission with converter lock-up. Fully mechanical / hydraulical control, no electrics or electronics. Mechanical throttle control input for kick-down function. Connects to external oil cooler. Uses ATF-II.
Application:
 1985–1992 Land Cruiser

A442F
Applications (calendar years):
 1993-early 1995 Land Cruiser 80 series
 1993-2007 had electronic control via solenoids and ECT Land Cruiser 80 series (Venezuela)
 1990-1992 Some early model year 92 HDJ80s had fully hydraulic A442F Land Cruiser 80 series
 1992-early 1995 A442F had electronic control via solenoids and ECT  Land Cruiser 80 series
 1998–2004 Land Cruiser 100 series diesel (South Africa)

A443E
Applications (calendar years):
 2000–2002 Toyota Dyna 4.9 D (XZU411)

A443F
Applications (calendar years):
 1995–2002 Toyota Mega Cruiser

A5xx
FF Transaxle

A540E
Applications (calendar years):
 1988–1998 Camry (V6)
 1993 Camry (V6)
 1992–1993 Lexus ES300
 1998–2000 Sienna
 1996 Camry prominent

A540H
Applications (calendar years):
 1989–1991 Camry (4-cyl AWD)
 1996–1999 RAV4 (4x4)

(This particular version has a weak reverse – prone to noise and failure – failure included problems with 1st brake)

A541E
Applications (calendar years):
 1994–2001 Toyota Camry (V6)
 1995–2004 Toyota Avalon
 1999–2003 Toyota Solara (V6)
 2001–2003 Toyota Sienna
 1994–1998 Lexus ES 300

(USA 1997–2004) gear ratios

(Aus 2000–2004) gear ratios

A6xx
FR Transmission

A650E
5 Speed Automatic Transmission

I6 and V8 versions similar. However V8 versions have slight internal upgrades to handle the increased torque (35-50LS?).

Applications (calendar years):
 1998–2005 Lexus GS 300
 1998–2005 Lexus GS 430
 1998–2000 Lexus LS 400
 2001–2005 Lexus IS 300
 1998–2005 Toyota Altezza RS200
 2001–2003 Lexus LS 430
 2001–2005 Lexus SC 430
 1999–2004 Toyota Crown Majesta 4.0
 1997-2001 Lexus SC 400 / GS400

A7xx
FR Transmission

A750E
5 Speed Automatic Transmission

Applications (calendar years):
 2003–2009 Toyota 4Runner (V8) (BA bell housing)
 2005 to present Toyota 4Runner (V6) 
 2005–2015 Toyota Tacoma (V6)
 2007–present Toyota FJ Cruiser 4x2
 2005–2009 Toyota Tundra
 2004–2009 Toyota Sequoia
 2005– Toyota Hilux

A750F
5 Speed Automatic Transmission(4x4)

Applications (calendar years):
 2003 to present Toyota 4Runner (4x4)
 2005–2015 Toyota Tacoma (V6 4x4)
 2005–2009 Toyota Tundra (4x4)
 2004–2009 Toyota Sequoia (4x4)
 2007– Toyota FJ Cruiser (4x4)
 2003–2007 Toyota Land Cruiser 100-series (4x4)
 2003–2009 Lexus GX 470 (4x4)
 2003–2007 Lexus LX 470 (4x4)
 2005– Toyota Land Cruiser Prado (4x4)
 2005– Toyota Fortuner 4.0L
 2005–2015 Toyota Hilux (4x4)
 2009-2021 Mitsubishi Pajero (4x4)
 2012-2016 Isuzu D-max (4x4)
 2013-2016 Isuzu MU-X (4x4)

A750H
5 Speed Automatic Transmission

Applications (calendar years):
 2004–2009 Toyota Mark X (AWD)

A760E
6 Speed Automatic Transmission

Applications (calendar years):
 2005–2007 Lexus GS 300
 2005-2013 Lexus IS 300
 2005–2013 Lexus IS 350
 2006–2013 Lexus GS 350
 2010–2019 Toyota Tundra 4.6L
 2010–2019 Toyota Sequoia 4.6L
 2009–2019 Toyota Mark X (GRX133)
 2004–2008 Toyota Crown GRS184
 2008–2012 Toyota Crown GRS204

A760F
 2010–2019 Toyota Tundra 4.6L 4WD
 2010–2019 Toyota Sequoia 4.6L 4WD
 2010–2019 Lexus GX 460

A760H
6 Speed Automatic Transmission

Applications (calendar years):
 2005–2007 Lexus GS 300 (AWD)
 2006–2007 Lexus GS 350 (AWD)
 2006–2013 Lexus IS 250 (AWD)
 2007–2008 Lexus GS 350 (AWD)
 2008 Lexus GS 350 (AWD)
 2009–present Toyota Mark X (AWD)

A761E
6 Speed Automatic Transmission

Applications (calendar years):
 2003–2006 Lexus LS 430
 2005–2007 Lexus GS 430
 2005–2010 Lexus SC 430
 2005–2016 Toyota Century
 2004–2007 Toyota Crown Majesta UZS186

A761H 
6 Speed Automatic Transmission with transfer case for AWD application

Applications (calendar years):
 2004–2007 Toyota Crown Majesta UZS187

A8xx 
FR Transmission

A860E
6 Speed Automatic Transmission

Applications (calendar years):
 Toyota Dyna Cargo (JDM)
 Hino Dutro
 Hino 300

A9xx
FR Transmission

A960E
6 Speed Automatic Transmission

Applications (calendar years):
 2006 Lexus GS 300
 2005–2013 Lexus IS (XE20)
 2008 Toyota Crown 2500CC
 2004–present Toyota Mark X (GRX120/121/130)
 2012–2021 Toyota 86/Scion FR-S/Subaru BRZ

AAxx
AWD/RWD transmission

AA80E
8-speed automatic transmission

Applications (calendar years):
 2007–2017 Lexus LS 460
 2008–2011 Lexus GS 460
 2008–2014 Lexus IS F
 2009–2013 Toyota Crown Majesta
 2014–2019 Cadillac CTS (Aisin TL-80SN variant with a 4.056 reverse gear and a 2.85 final drive ratio)
 2016–present Lexus RC F (3.133 final drive)
 2016–2020 Lexus GS F (2.937 final drive)
 2021-present Lexus IS 500 F Sport Performance (3.133 final drive)

Gear ratios:

The AA80E (Aisin TL-80SN) becomes the world's first eight-speed automatic transmission.  Smaller parts, a hydraulic circuit with fewer components allow the transmission to maintain the same size as the previous LS 430's unit.  The aluminum die-cast case is 10% lighter, yet 30% more rigid, even with two additional gears and a 22% greater torque capacity the new transmission weighs 95 kg or 10% more than the previous unit.  With new micro-laser technology gear tooth production tolerances have been reduced 50%.  Aluminum has also replaced steel on gear tooth surfaces.  Shift times are as low as 350 milliseconds or 41% faster than the previous LS 430's six-speed auto.

The IS F and LS 460 (with sport package) use Sport Direct Shift (SPDS) which allows for faster shift times.  The torque converter can lockup from 2nd to 6th gears.  Final drive ratio is 2.937.

AA80F
8-speed automatic AWD transmission. Same gear ratios as the AA80E but a shorter 3.133 final drive ratio is used.

Application(s):
 Lexus LS 460

AA81E
Pairs with Toyota 2GR-FSE V6 engine.
 2014–2020 Lexus GS 350 (2.937 final drive)
 2014–present Lexus IS 350 (3.133 final drive)
 2015–present Lexus RC 350
 2013–present Toyota Crown Athlete

AB6xx
FR transmission

AB60E
6 Speed Automatic Transmission

Torque converter lockup in 4th, 5th and 6th gears. Electronic control. Two overdrives.

Applications (calendar years):
2007– Toyota Tundra 5.7L
2008– Toyota Sequoia 5.7L

Gear ratios:

AB60F
6 Speed Automatic Transmission

Torque converter lockup in 5th and 6th gears.

Applications (calendar years):
2007– Toyota Tundra 5.7L (4x4)
2008– Toyota Sequoia 5.7L (4x4)
2009–2015 Lexus LX 570 (4x4)
2008–2021 Toyota Land Cruiser 200 1VD (4x4)

AC6xx
FR/4WD transmission

AC60E
6-speed Automatic Transmission

Torque converter lockup in 4th, 5th and 6th gears. Electronic control. Two overdrives.

Applications (calendar years):
 2015–present Toyota Hilux 2.4 D-4D Eighth generation (AN120/AN130)
 2015–present Toyota Innova/Innova Crysta
 2015–present Toyota Fortuner
 2017–present Toyota Land Cruiser Prado (2.8 diesel)

Gear ratios:

AC60F
6 Speed Automatic Transmission

Torque converter lockup in 5th and 6th gears.

Applications (calendar years):
 2015–present Toyota Hilux 2.4 D-4D AWD 2.8 D-4D AWD & V6 4.0L 1GR-FE 4WD Eighth generation (AN120/AN130)
 2016–present Toyota Tacoma 2.7 4WD & 3.5 4WD
 2019–present Toyota HiAce/Toyota Commuter 2.8 D-4D Sixth generation (H300)
 2019–present Toyota Land Cruiser V6 4.0 Dual VVTI GCC countries

AExx
AWD transmission

AE80F
8-speed automatic transmission

Applications (calendar years):
 2015–present Lexus LX 570
 2015–present Land Cruiser 5.7L
 2015–present Mitsubishi Pajero Sport

See also
Toyota Transmissions – Manual
List of Toyota transmissions
List of Toyota engines

References

External links
 Toyota Transmission Code(USA)
 Lexus Transmission Code(USA)
 Toyota Transmissions
 Corolland on A245E Automatic Transmission
 High performance A340E transmission

A